People in Parties is a Canadian two-part political television special which aired on CBC Television in 1960.

Premise
The series was a discussion of Canadian politics hosted by Davidson Dunton with a panel consisting of Queen's University political science professor John Meisel with Ottawa newspaper correspondents Clark Davey (Globe and Mail) and Tom Gould (Victoria Daily Times). The broadcasts included interview segments with Canadian members of Parliament.

Scheduling
 26 November 1960, 10:30 p.m. (Eastern): "The Golden Road To Power"
 2 December 1960, 10:30 p.m. (Eastern): "Who's Running The Country?"

References

External links
 

CBC Television original programming
1960 Canadian television series debuts
1960 Canadian television series endings